Muhammad Matloob Inkalabi was the former Senior Vice President of PPP AJ&K, a member of the legislative assembly of Azad Jammu and Kashmir from 2011 to 2016 and served as a Minister of Higher Education IT/TEVTA. He died in the early hours of 30 November 2020.

Muhammad Matloob Inkalabi was the member of the AJK Legislative Assembly from Khuiratta. Prior to his current designation he served as Secretary of Information for PPP-AJK, advisor to PM Pakistan, Member of AJK council and Chairman of Public Accounts Committee, Kashmir council. In the 2011 elections, he was elected as MLA from Khuiratta AJK and served as Minister for Higher Education/IT/TEVTA.

External links
legislative biography

20th-century births
2020 deaths
Year of birth missing
Pakistani politicians
People from Kotli District
Members of the Legislative Assembly of Azad Jammu and Kashmir